Fritz Popp (born 20 November 1940) is a retired German football player. He spent six seasons in the Bundesliga with 1. FC Nürnberg. As of February 2009, he is a player agent.

Honours
 Bundesliga: 1967–68

References

External links
 
 Fritz Popp at glubberer.de 

1940 births
Living people
German footballers
Bundesliga players
1. FC Nürnberg players
German football managers
1. FC Nürnberg managers
German sports agents
Association football agents
Bundesliga managers
Association football defenders
Footballers from Nuremberg